The 2012–13 A-1 League was the 22nd season of the A-1 League, the highest professional basketball league in Croatia.
The first half of the season consists of 10 teams and 100-game regular season (10 games for each of the 10 teams) begins on Saturday, October 6, 2012 and ended on Sunday, March 17, 2012. For second half of the season clubs will be divided into two groups. Championship group will consists of 4 teams from ABA League and the best 4 teams from first half of the season. Relegation group will consist of bottom 6 teams from first half of the season.

Teams and venues
Relegated to A-2 Liga
Sonik Puntamika (14th)Promoted from A-2 Liga'''
Osječki sokol (Champion)

Regular season

Championship Round

Relegation and Promotion Rounds

Relegation Round

Promotion Round

Relegation/Promotion play-off
Relegation league 5th-placed team Križevci faces the 2nd-placed Promotion league side Škrljevo in a two-legged play-off. The winner on aggregate score after both matches will earn a spot in the 2013–14 A-1 League.

Škrljevo vs. Križevci

Križevci retained its A-1 League status.

Playoffs

Bracket

Semifinals
The semifinals are best-of-3 series.

Cibona vs. Jolly JBŠ

Zadar vs. Cedevita

Finals
The finals are best-of-5 series.

Cibona vs. Zadar

External links
Official Site 
Scoresway Page
Eurobasket.com League Page

A-1 Liga seasons
Croatian
A1